

Elementary and secondary schools
Richmond City Public Schools, the city's public school system, comprises 5 high schools, 9 middle schools, 28 elementary schools, and 9 special-purpose/preschools. In 2011, Mayor Dwight C. Jones announced the replacement of Broad Rock Elementary, Oak Grove Elementary, and Huguenot High schools in the South Richmond district, along with the replacement of Martin Luther King Jr. Middle in the East End district. The elementary school replacements have broken ground, while Huguenot remains to be replaced. The elementary schools are ranked highly among urban area school districts, while the middle and high schools are a bit rougher. In a 2009 Richmond Times-Dispatch article, titled "Dropping In", it was declared that the high school dropout rate was "hovering" at around 15 percent, a number that the city is now working to improve on.

Elementary schools
 Bellevue Elementary School
 Blackwell Elementary School
 Broad Rock Elementary School
 George Washington Carver Elementary School
 John B. Cary Elementary School
 Chimborazo Elementary School
 Clark Springs Elementary School
 Fairfield Court Elementary School
 J. B. Fisher Elementary School
 William Fox Elementary School
 J. L. Francis Elementary School
 Ginter Park Elementary School
 E. S. H. Greene Elementary School
 Linwood Holton Elementary School
 Miles J. Jones Elementary School
 George Mason Elementary School
 Maymont Elementary School
 Mary Munford Elementary School
 Oak Grove Elementary School
 Overby-Sheppard Elementary School
 E. D. Redd Elementary School
 G. H. Reid Elementary School
 Southampton Elementary School
 J. E. B. Stuart Elementary School
 Summer Hill Elementary School
 Swansboro Elementary School
 Westover Hills Elementary School
 Woodville Elementary School

Middle schools
 Binford Middle School
 Thomas C. Boushall Middle School
 Lucille M. Brown Middle School
 Chandler Middle School
 Elkhardt Middle School
 Thomas H. Henderson Model Middle School
 Albert Hill Middle School
 Martin Luther King Jr. Middle School
 Fred D. Thompson Middle School

High schools
 Armstrong High School
 Huguenot High School
 Thomas Jefferson High School
 John Marshall High School
 George Wythe High School

Private schools and advanced schools
There are also a number of private schools in the city, including Saint Gertrude High School, founded in 1922. It is one of the city of Richmond's oldest functioning private schools. Also notable are the special purpose (or advanced) schools, such as notable magnet school Maggie L. Walker Governor's School for Government and International Studies, a school that receives a little over 2000 submissions a year. It is among the leading high schools in the nation, and maintains an excellent SAT score average of 2047, well over the national average. The International Baccalaureate programs are also located in many schools throughout the metro region, with all three stages of the IB (Primary Years Programme, Middle Years Programme, and Diploma Programme) being offered at elementary, middle, and high schools abroad. Examples include Three Chopt Elementary in Henrico, Moody Middle (also in Henrico), and Hanover High School, in Hanover.

Universities and colleges
Richmond is known as being a college town with a big city feel. There are several universities known nationwide, and some locally known. Most notable are the regions two Division I schools, the University of Richmond, and Virginia Commonwealth University, or as it is affectionately called, "VCU". The former is a small, suburban private institution, while the latter is a public, Carnegie-certified research university, noted for its "high research levels". It sits on two campuses, the Monroe Park campus, and the MCV campus. VCU has over 32,000 students, making it the largest university in the Commonwealth in terms of number of students. Also, its athletics division, collectively known as the VCU Rams, garnered national attention when the men's basketball team reached the 2011 NCAA Final Four, the semifinals of the college basketball division. Here is a complete list of Richmond's colleges and universities:

 Virginia Commonwealth University
 University of Richmond
 Virginia Union University
 Randolph Macon College (located in nearby Ashland)
 Virginia State University (located in nearby Petersburg)

References